The British National Omnium Championships are held annually as part of the British National Track Championships organised by British Cycling. A women's championship was held for the first time in 2017.

Elite

Men's Senior Race

Women's Senior Race

Juniors

Male Youth Under 14 Race

Male Youth Under 12 Race

Female Youth Under 14 Race

Female Youth Under 12 Race

References

Cycle racing in the United Kingdom
National track cycling championships
National championships in the United Kingdom
Annual sporting events in the United Kingdom